HD 93403 is a spectroscopic binary containing two highly luminous hot blue stars. It is 10,000 light years away in the Carina Nebula in the constellation Carina. It appears to have spectral type O5.5III, but this is composed of two spectra from a blue supergiant and blue main sequence star of spectral type O5.5I and O7V respectively.

HD 93403 exhibits the Struve-Sahade effect, where the strength of the spectral lines of the individual components varies during the orbit.  It also has colliding stellar winds that produce variable x-ray and non-thermal radio emission.

References

Carina (constellation)
Carina Nebula
093403
O-type supergiants
O-type main-sequence stars
J10454411-5924281
052628
Emission-line stars
CD-58 3545
Spectroscopic binaries